Amantius or Amancius may refer to several figures in Roman and early Christian history:

Saints
Saint martyred with Saint Getulius, d. 120 AD
Saint Amantius of Como (died 448), bishop of Como, succeeded by Abundius

Bishops
Amantius of Rodez (400–440), a bishop of the Roman Catholic Diocese of Rodez
The name of an archbishop of Reims (third century)
The name of the first bishop of Nice (4th century)
A ninth-century bishop of Sisteron (ninth century)
A bishop of the Ancient Diocese of Saint-Paul-Trois-Châteaux

Others
 Amantius (praepositus), Byzantine grand chamberlain

See also